Þórir jökull Steinfinnsson was an Icelandic 13th century warrior and possibly a skald.

Overview

Life
Þórir was captured following the Battle of Örlygsstaðir, fought on August 21, 1238.  He was executed along with five others, whose names are recorded in the Íslendinga saga, included in the Sturlunga saga.  Also given are the names of the about fifty combatants who were killed on that day.  Þórir’s executioner was a man allowed to perform the execution to avenge Þórir’s killing of his brother at the Battle of Bær, which occurred on April 28, 1237.

Poem

Þórir is known for a poem he recited before his execution.

References

 Faulkes, Anthony (1993). What Was Viking Poetry For?. University of Birmingham. 
 Jón Jóhannesson, Magnus Finnbogason and Kristján Eldjárn, editors, Sturlunga Saga, Vol 1 & 2, Sturlunguútgáfan, Reykjavík, 1946

Icelandic poets
Skalds
13th-century Icelandic people
People executed by Iceland by decapitation
Executed Icelandic people
13th-century executions
Executed military personnel
Year of birth unknown
13th-century Icelandic poets